Sar Kalandan (also Romanized as Sar Kalāndan) is a village in Irafshan Rural District, Ashar District, Mehrestan County, Sistan and Baluchestan Province, Iran. At the 2006 census, its population was 568, in 106 families.

References 

Populated places in Mehrestan County